On 21 February 2022, a major explosion, followed by several smaller ones, occurred at a mine in Gbomblora, Gbomblora Department, Burkina Faso. They killed about 60 people; over 100 people were injured.

The explosions were most likely related to the chemicals that were used to treat the gold.

References

2022 in Burkina Faso
2022 disasters in Burkina Faso 
Explosions in 2022
Explosions in Burkina Faso
February 2022 events in Africa
Gold mining disasters
Mining in Burkina Faso
Poni Province